During the 1996–97 English football season, Tranmere Rovers F.C. competed in the Football League First Division.

Season summary
Another decent season for Tranmere in player-manager John Aldridge's first full season in charge resulted in another mid-table finish, this time finishing two places higher than last season, in 11th.

Final league table

Results
Tranmere Rovers' score comes first

Legend

Football League First Division

FA Cup

League Cup

Squad

References

Tranmere Rovers F.C. seasons
Tranmere Rovers